Leick is a surname. Notable people with the surname include:

Carl W. Leick (1854–1939), American architect
Gwendolyn Leick (born 1951), Austrian British historian, Assyriologist, and weightlifter
Hudson Leick (born 1969), American actress

Surnames of German origin